The Men's 200m T37 had its First Round held on September 15 at 10:59 and the Final on September 16 at 17:17.

Medalists

Results

References
Round 1 - Heat 1
Round 1 - Heat 2
Final

Athletics at the 2008 Summer Paralympics